Jani Aaltonen (born 22 January 1990) is a Finnish footballer.

References

External links
 

Living people
Finnish footballers
1990 births
Åbo IFK players
Maskun Palloseura players
Association football defenders